Stan TV is a Kazakh news outlet. In December 2012, the Bostandyk District Court in Almaty reportedly ordered Stan TV to halt news programming for alleged violation of "Kazakhstan's laws on extremism and national security".

References

External links

Kazakhstani news websites
Mass media in Almaty
Television stations in Kazakhstan